Northern Health is the publicly funded healthcare provider for the northern half of the Canadian province of British Columbia.
Northern Health serves over 300,000 people in an area of 600,000 square kilometres. It was established as one of five geographically based health authorities in 2001 by the Government of British Columbia.

The health region operates over two dozen hospitals, several long-term care facilities for seniors, public health units, as well as addictions and mental health services. As of 2020, Northern Health employs over 7,000 individuals throughout the region.

Northern Health has received recognition in the Excellence in BC Healthcare Awards for its Care North primary care renewal initiative, as well as its NH Connections medical travel assistance program.

Communities 
Northern Health services the communities of:

Facilities 
Northern Health's 18 hospitals include:

See also 

Other regional health authorities in British Columbia

 Vancouver Coastal Health
 Fraser Health
 Interior Health
 Island Health

Province-wide health authorities in British Columbia

 Provincial Health Services Authority
 First Nations Health Authority

References

External links 
 Northern Health website

2001 establishments in British Columbia
Health regions of British Columbia